Flamengo Station is a subway station on the Rio de Janeiro Metro that services the neighbourhood of Flamengo in the South Zone of Rio de Janeiro.

The station was opened in 1981 and was originally known as Morro Azul.

References

Metrô Rio stations
Railway stations opened in 1981